Caleta Godoy Formation is a geological formation whose main outcrops lie around Chacao Channel in southern Chile. The formation overlies Bahía Mansa Metamorphic Complex and Santo Domingo Formation.

Description 
Caleta Godoy's strata are always found horizontally even in places where the underlying Santo Domingo Formation have its strata tilted 90 degrees (angular unconformity). The formation contains mollusc fossils and ichnofossils of Ophiomorpha and Planolites can be observed. Caleta Godoy Formation was deposited in a shallow marine environment during a small marine transgression different from that associated with Santo Domingo Formation. The formation is analogous to Licancheu and Tubul Formation found further north.

References 

Geologic formations of Chile
Pliocene Series of South America
Neogene Chile
Sandstone formations
Siltstone formations
Coal formations
Coal in Chile
Tuff formations
Shallow marine deposits
Geology of Los Lagos Region
Geology of Los Ríos Region
Chiloé Archipelago